Sony Interactive Entertainment (SIE) is a multinational video game and digital entertainment company owned by multinational conglomerate Sony. SIE primarily operates the PlayStation brand of video game consoles and products. SIE is made up of two legal corporate entities: Sony Interactive Entertainment LLC (SIE LLC) based in San Mateo, California, and Sony Interactive Entertainment Inc. (SIE Inc.), based in Minato, Tokyo. SIE Inc. was originally founded as Sony Computer Entertainment Inc. (SCEI or SCE) in November 1993 to handle Sony's venture into video game development for the PlayStation systems. SIE LLC was established in San Mateo in April 2016, and is managed through Sony's American branch, Sony Corporation of America.

Since the launch of the original PlayStation console in 1994, the company has been developing PlayStation home video game consoles, accessories and services. The company expanded from Japan into North America and Europe, where it founded the branches Sony Computer Entertainment America (SCEA) in May 1995 (in Foster City, California) and Sony Computer Entertainment Europe (SCEE) in July 1995 (in Liverpool). The company quickly became Sony's main resource for research and development in video games and interactive entertainment. In April 2016, SCE and Sony Network Entertainment International was restructured and reorganized into Sony Interactive Entertainment, carrying over the operations and primary objectives from both companies. The same year, SIE LLC was established, with its headquarters in San Mateo, California.

Sony Interactive Entertainment handles the research and development, production, and sales of both hardware and software for the PlayStation video game systems. SIE is also a developer and publisher of video game titles, and operates several subsidiaries in Sony's largest markets: North America, Europe and Asia. By June 2022, the company had sold more than 581 million PlayStation consoles worldwide.

History

Establishment, PlayStation release, and North American expansion (1993–2005)

Sony Computer Entertainment, Inc. (SCEI) was jointly established by Sony and its subsidiary Sony Music Entertainment Japan in 1993 to handle the company's ventures into the video game industry. The original PlayStation console was released on December 3, 1994, in Japan. The company's North American operations, Sony Computer Entertainment of America (SCEA), were originally established in May 1995 as a division of Sony Electronic Publishing. Located in Foster City, California, the North American office was originally headed by Steve Race.

In the months prior to the release of the PlayStation in Western markets, the operations were restructured: All video game marketing from Sony Imagesoft was folded into SCEA in July 1995, with most affected employees transferred from Santa Monica to Foster City. On August 7, 1995, Race unexpectedly resigned and was named CEO of Spectrum HoloByte three days later. He was replaced by Sony Electronics veteran Martin Homlish. This proved to be the beginning of a run of exceptional managerial turnover, with SCEA going through four presidents in a single year. The PS console was released in the United States on September 9, 1995. As part of a worldwide restructuring at the beginning of 1997, SCEA and Sony Computer Entertainment Europe (SCEE) were both re-established as wholly owned subsidiaries of SCEI.

The launch of the second PS console, the PlayStation 2 was released in Japan on March 4, 2000, and the U.S. on October 26, 2000. On July 1, 2002, chairman of SCEI, Shigeo Maruyama, was replaced by Tamotsu Iba as chairman. Jack Tretton and Phil Harrison were also promoted to senior vice presidents of SCE. The PlayStation Portable (PSP) was SCEI's first foray into the small handheld console market. Its development was first announced during SCE's E3 conference in 2003, and it was officially unveiled during their E3 conference on May 11, 2004. The system was released in Japan on December 12, 2004, in North America on March 24, 2005, and in Europe and Australia on September 1, 2005.

Creation of SCE Worldwide Studios, acquisitions, and restructure (2005–2011)
On September 14, 2005, SCEI formed SCE Worldwide Studios, a single internal entity to oversee all wholly-owned development studios within SCEI. It became responsible for the creative and strategic direction of development and production of all computer entertainment software by all SCEI-owned studios—all software is produced exclusively for the PS family of consoles. Shuhei Yoshida was named as president of Worldwide Studios on May 16, 2008, replacing Kazuo Hirai, who was serving interim after Harrison left the company in early 2008.

On December 8, 2005, video game developer Guerrilla Games, developers of the Killzone series, was acquired by Sony Computer Entertainment as part of Worldwide Studios. On January 24, 2006, video game developer Zipper Interactive, developers of the Socom series, was acquired by Sony Computer Entertainment as part of Worldwide Studios.

In March 2006, Sony announced the online network for its forthcoming PlayStation 3 (PS3) system at the 2006 PlayStation Business Briefing meeting in Tokyo, Japan, tentatively named "PlayStation Network Platform" and eventually called just PlayStation Network (PSN). Sony also stated that the service would always be connected, free, and include multiplayer support.

The launch date for the PS3 was announced by Hirai at the pre-E3 conference held at the Sony Pictures Studios in Culver City, California, on May 8, 2006. The PS3 was released in Japan on November 11, 2006, and the U.S. date was November 17, 2006. The PSN was also launched in November 2006.

On November 30, 2006, president of SCEI, Ken Kutaragi, was appointed as chairman of SCEI, while Hirai, then president of SCEA, was promoted to president of SCEI. On April 26, 2007, Ken Kutaragi resigned from his position as chairman of SCEI and group CEO, passing on his duties to the recently appointed president of SCE, Hirai.

On September 20, 2007, video game developers Evolution Studios and Bigbig Studios, creators of the MotorStorm series, were acquired by Sony Computer Entertainment as part of Worldwide Studios.

On April 15, 2009, David Reeves, president and CEO of SCE Europe, announced his forthcoming resignation from his post. He had joined the company in 1995 and was appointed as chairman of SCEE in 2003, and then president in 2005. His role of president and CEO of SCEE would be taken over by Andrew House, who joined Sony Corporation in 1990. The PSP Go was released on October 1, 2009, for North America and Europe, and on November 1, 2009, for Japan.

On April 1, 2010, SCEI was restructured to bring together Sony's mobile electronics and personal computers divisions. The main Japanese division of SCEI was temporarily renamed "SNE Platform Inc." (SNEP) on April 1, 2010, and was split into two divisions that focused on different aspects: "Sony Computer Entertainment, Inc.", consisting of 1,300 employees who focused on the console business, and the network service business consisting of 60 to 70 employees. The network service business of SCEI was absorbed into Sony Corp's Network Products & Service Group (NPSG), which had already been headed by Hirai since April 2009. The original SCEI was then dissolved after the restructuring.

The North American and European branches of SCEI were affected by the restructuring, and remained as SCEA and SCEE. Hirai, by that time SCEI CEO and Sony Corporation EVP, led both departments.

On March 2, 2010, video game developer Media Molecule, developers of the PlayStation 3 (PS3) game LittleBigPlanet, was acquired by SCEI as part of Worldwide Studios. On April 20, 2011, SCEI was the victim of an attack on its PlayStation Network system, which also affected its online division, Sony Online Entertainment. On August 1, 2011, video game developer Sucker Punch Productions, developers of the Sly Cooper and Infamous series, was also acquired.

Launch of PlayStation Vita and PlayStation 4, expansion into China (2011–2016)
In January 2012, BigBig Studios was closed and Cambridge Studio—renamed Guerrilla Cambridge—becoming a sister studio of Guerrilla Games. In March 2012, Zipper Interactive, developers of the SOCOM series, MAG and Unit 13, was closed. On June 25, 2012, Hirai retired as chairman of Sony Computer Entertainment; however, he remains on the board of directors.

On July 2, 2012, Sony Computer Entertainment acquired Gaikai, a cloud-based gaming service. In August 2012, Studio Liverpool, developer of the Wipeout and Formula One series, was closed. In August 2012, Sony Computer Entertainment announced PlayStation Mobile for Vita and PlayStation certified devices, with a developers such has THQ, Team17 and Action Button Entertainment signed up.

A press release was published on August 20, 2013, announcing the release date of the PlayStation 4 (PS4) console. On that date, SCEI introduced the CUH-1000A series system, and announced the launch date as November 15, 2013, for North American markets and November 29, 2013, for European, Australasian and Central and South American markets.

Following a January 2014 announcement by the Chinese government that the country's 14-year game console ban would be lifted, the PS4 was scheduled to be the first Sony video game console to be officially and legally released in China since the PlayStation 2.

On March 6, 2014, Sony Computer Entertainment of America President and CEO, Tretton, announced he was resigning from his position at the end of the month, citing a mutual agreement between himself and SCEA for the cessation of his contract. Tretton had worked at SCEA since 1995 and was a founding member of the company's executive team. He was involved in the launch of all PlayStation platforms in North America, including the original PlayStation, PS2, PSP, PS3, PSN, PS Vita, and PS4. Tretton was replaced by Shawn Layden, who was the vice-president and chief operating officer (COO) of Sony Network Entertainment International, effective April 1, 2014. On April 2, 2015, it was announced that Sony Computer Entertainment had acquired the intellectual property of the cloud gaming service OnLive, and that its services would cease by the end of the month.

The beta version of Sony's first-ever cloud-based television service, PlayStation Vue (PSVue), was launched in the U.S. in November 2014. It was only offered on an invite-only basis for PS3 and PS4 users, prior to its official launch in early 2015. Sony signed deals with major networks, including CBS, Discovery, Fox, and Viacom, so that users can view live streaming video, as well as catch up and on-demand content, from more than 75 channels, such as Comedy Central and Nickelodeon. Although pricing and release dates for other regions was not publicized, Sony confirmed that PSVue will eventually be available on iPad, followed by other Sony and non-Sony devices.

As Sony Interactive Entertainment (2016–present)
On January 26, 2016, Sony announced that effective April 1, 2016, Sony Computer Entertainment and Sony Network Entertainment International would be re-organized and combined into a new company, Sony Interactive Entertainment (SIE). Unlike the former SCE, SIE is based in San Mateo, California, and represents the entire PlayStation brand, regional subsidiaries, and its content operations. On March 24, 2016, Sony announced the establishment of ForwardWorks, a new studio dedicated to producing "full-fledged" games based on Sony intellectual properties for mobile platforms such as smartphones.

It was reported in December 2016 by multiple news outlets that Sony was considering restructuring its U.S. operations by merging its TV and film business with SIE. According to the reports, such a restructuring would have placed Sony Pictures under Sony Interactive's CEO, Andrew House, though House wouldn't have taken over day-to-day operations of the film studio. According to one report, Sony was set to make a final decision on the possibility of the merger of the TV, film, and gaming businesses by the end of its fiscal year in March of the following year (2017). However, judging by Sony's activity in 2017, the rumored merger never materialized.

On January 8, 2019, Sony announced that the company had entered into a definitive agreement for Sony Interactive Entertainment to acquire Audiokinetic.

On March 20, 2019, Sony Interactive Entertainment launched the educational video game platform toio in Japan.

On May 20, 2019, Sony Interactive Entertainment announced that the company had launched PlayStation Productions, a production studio that will mine the company's extensive catalogue of video game titles for film and television. The new venture is headed by Asad Qizilbash and overseen by Shawn Layden, chairman of Worldwide Studios.

On August 19, 2019, Sony Interactive Entertainment announced that the company had entered into definitive agreements to acquire Insomniac Games. The acquisition was completed on November 15, 2019, where Sony paid ¥24,895 million (US$229 million) in cash.

On November 8, 2019, Gobind Singh Deo, Malaysia's Minister of Communications and Multimedia, announced that Sony Interactive Entertainment would open a new development office in the country as in 2020 to provide art and animation as part of Worldwide Studios' efforts to make exclusive games for PlayStation consoles. The studio will be Sony Interactive Entertainment's first studio in Southeast Asia.

SIE announced the formation of PlayStation Studios in May 2020 to be formally introduced alongside the PlayStation 5 later in 2020. PlayStation Studios will serve as an umbrella organization for its first-party game development studios, including Naughty Dog, Insomniac, Santa Monica Studio, Media Molecule and Guerrilla Games, as well as used for branding on games developed by studios brought in by Sony in work-for-hire situations. Sony plans to use the "PlayStation Studios" branding on both PlayStation 5 and new PlayStation 4 games to help with consumer recognition, though the branding was not ready for some of Sony's mid-2020 releases like The Last of Us Part II.

SIE's parent Sony bought a minority stake in Epic Games for $250 million in July 2020, giving the company about a 1.4% stake in Epic. The investment came after Sony helped with Epic's development of new technologies in its Unreal Engine 5, which it was positioning for use in powering games on the upcoming PlayStation 5 to take advantage of its high speed internal storage solutions for in-game streaming.

In March 2021, SIE announced that it and RTS acquired the assets and properties of the Evolution Championship Series as a joint venture.

On April 13, 2021, Epic Games announced that it received an additional $200 million strategic investment from SIE's parent Sony Group Corporation.

On May 3, 2021, Sony Interactive Entertainment announced the acquisition of a minority stake in Discord, which will be integrated into the PlayStation Network by early 2022.

On June 29, 2021, Sony Interactive Entertainment announced the acquisition of Housemarque.

On July 1, 2021, Sony Interactive Entertainment announced the acquisition of Nixxes Software. Jim Ryan said later that month that they plan to work with Nixxes to release more of their PlayStation games to personal computers.

On September 8, 2021, Sony Interactive Entertainment announced the acquisition of Firesprite, a Liverpool-based developer with over 250 employees. The studio has multiple projects in development, with the projects focusing on genres outside the core offerings of PlayStation Studios. On September 29, 2021, Firesprite announced that it had acquired Fabrik Games, bringing the studio's headcount to 265.

On September 30, 2021, Sony Interactive Entertainment announced that Bluepoint Games had joined PlayStation Studios, with Bluepoint working on original content instead of remaking an older game.

On November 4, 2021, Sony Interactive Entertainment acquired a 5% stake in the video game publisher Devolver Digital.

On December 10, 2021, Sony Interactive Entertainment announced the acquisition of the Seattle-based studio Valkyrie Entertainment.

Sony Interactive Entertainment announced its intent to purchase Bungie for $3.6 billion in January 2022. This deal closed on July 15, 2022. Under terms of this deal, Bungie remained an independent development studio and publisher, allowing Bungie to pursue development outside Sony's platforms, and was intended to help bolster live service games for SIE.

Sony Interactive Entertainment acquired Jade Raymond's Haven Studios in March 2022 and incorporating it as part of PlayStation Studios, making the studio Sony's first development team in Canada.

On July 18, 2022, Sony Interactive Entertainment and Repeat.gg announced that Sony Interactive Entertainment had acquired Repeat.gg.

On August 29, 2022, Sony Interactive Entertainment and Savege Game Studios announced that Sony Interactive Entertainment had acquired Savege Game Studios, a mobile game development studio with offices in Helsinki and Berlin. Savage Game Studios joined the newly created PlayStation Studios Mobile Division, an independent operation from console development.

On August 31, 2022, it was announced that Sony Interactive Entertainment has acquired a 14.09% stake in FromSoftware.

Corporate affairs

The president, and CEO of SIE is Jim Ryan, replacing John (Tsuyoshi) Kodera, who stepped down in April 2019. Kodera would leave SIE in 2021. Andrew House served as president and CEO from 2011 until October 2017, after stepping down from the role House served as chairman until the end of the year. House replaced Kaz Hirai as president and CEO in 2011, who himself had replaced longtime CEO Ken Kutaragi, also known as the "Father of the PlayStation". Kutaragi retired from his executive position at SIE on June 19, 2007, and holds the title of honorary chairman at the company. As of November 7, 2019, Hermen Hulst is the Head of Worldwide Studios.

Headquarters
SIE currently has eight main headquarters around the world. They are as follows:
Sony Interactive Entertainment LLC (San Mateo, California) — the global and regional headquarters for North America and Latin America (except Cuba and the Caribbean countries)
Sony Interactive Entertainment Europe Limited (London, England) — controls operations in Europe, South Africa, Middle East, India, Turkey, Australia and New Zealand (except Russia, Egypt, Belarus and Baltic countries)
Sony Interactive Entertainment Inc. and Sony Interactive Entertainment Japan Asia (Minato, Tokyo, Japan) — controls operations in Japan and was also formerly the regional headquarters for Sony Computer Entertainment Inc.
Sony Interactive Entertainment Korea (Seoul, South Korea) — controls South Korean operations
Sony Interactive Entertainment Singapore (Singapore) — controls Southeast Asia operations
Sony Interactive Entertainment Taiwan (Taipei, Taiwan) — controls Taiwanese operations
Sony Interactive Entertainment Shanghai (Shanghai, China) — controls operations in mainland China
Sony Interactive Entertainment Hong Kong (Hong Kong) — controls operations around Hong Kong and Macau

SIE also has smaller offices and distribution centers in Los Angeles, California (Hollywood), San Diego, California; Toronto, Ontario; Melbourne, Australia; Seoul, South Korea (Seocho-gu), Singapore; Shanghai, China and Liverpool, England.

Game approval
SIE evaluates and approves games for its consoles. The process is more strict than for the Nintendo Seal of Quality, and developers submit game concepts to Sony early in the design process. Each SIE unit has its own evaluation process; SIEE, for example, approved Billy the Wizard for its consumers but SIEA did not. The company sometimes imposes additional restrictions, such as when it prohibited PS and PS2 games from being ported to the PSP without 30% of content being new to the Sony console.

Hardware

PlayStation
SCEI produces the PlayStation line of video game hardware that consists of consoles and handhelds. Sony's first wide home console release, the PlayStation (codenamed "PSX" during development), was initially designed to be a CD-ROM drive add-on for Nintendo's Super NES (a.k.a. "Super Famicom" in Japan) video game console, in response to add-ons for competing platforms such as the TurboGrafx-CD and the Sega CD (sold as the PC Engine CD-ROM² System and Mega CD in Japan respectively). When the prospect of releasing the system as an add-on dissolved, Sony redesigned the machine into a standalone unit.

The PlayStation was released in Japan on December 3, 1994, and later in North America on September 9, 1995. By the end of the console 12-year production cycle, the PlayStation had sold 102 million units.

PlayStation 2
SCEI's second home console, the PlayStation 2 (PS2) was released in Japan on March 4, 2000, and later in North America and Europe in October and November 2000, respectively. The PS2 is powered by a proprietary central processing unit, the Emotion Engine, and was the first video game console to have DVD playback functionality and also backwards compatibility with the original PlayStation games included out of the box.

The PS2 consisted of a DVD drive and retailed in the U.S. for US$299. SCEI received heavy criticism after the launch of the PS2 due to the games released as part of the launch, difficulties that it presented for video game designers, and users who struggled to port Sega Dreamcast games to the system. However, despite these complaints, the PlayStation 2 received widespread support from third party developers throughout its lifespan on the market.

On December 28, 2012, Sony confirmed that it would cease production of the PS2 through a gradual process that started in Japan—the continuing popularity of the console in markets like Brazil and India meant that PS2 products would still be shipped, while games for the console were released in March 2013. The PS2 stands as the best-selling home video game console in history, with a total of 155 million consoles sold.

Writing for the ExtremeTech website at the end of 2012, James Plafke described the PS2 as revolutionary and proclaimed that the console "turn[ed] the gaming industry on its head":

Aside from being the “first” next-gen console, as well as providing many, many people with their first DVD player, the PlayStation 2 launched in something of a Golden Age of the non-PC gaming industry. Gaming tech was becoming extremely sophisticated ... Sony seemingly knew the exact route toward popularity, turning the console with the least powerful hardware of that generation into a juggernaut of success.

PlayStation Portable
The PlayStation Portable (PSP) was SCEI's first foray into the small handheld console market. Its development was first announced during SCE's E3 conference in 2003, and it was officially unveiled during their E3 conference on May 11, 2004. The system was released in Japan on December 12, 2004, in North America on March 24, 2005, and in Europe and Australia on September 1, 2005. The console has since seen two major redesigns, with new features including smaller size, more internal memory, a better quality LCD screen and lighter weight.

PlayStation 3
The launch date for the PS3 was announced by Hirai at the pre-E3 conference held at Sony Pictures Studios in Los Angeles, California, on May 8, 2006. The PS3 was released in Japan on November 11, 2006, and the U.S. date was November 17, 2006. Technology journalists observed that Sony had followed what Microsoft did with the Xbox 360, and produced the PS3 in two versions: one with a 20GB hard drive and the other with a 60GB hard drive.

The PS3 utilizes a unique processing architecture, the Cell microprocessor, a proprietary technology developed by Sony in conjunction with Toshiba and IBM. The graphics processing unit, the RSX 'Reality Synthesizer', was co-developed by Nvidia and Sony. Several variations of the PS3 have been released, each with slight hardware and software differences, and each denoted by the varying size of the included hard disk drive.

PlayStation Vita
The PS Vita is the successor to the PlayStation Portable. It was released in Japan and other parts of Asia on December 17, 2011, and then in Europe, Australia and North America on February 22, 2012.

Internally, the Vita features a 4-core ARM Cortex-A9 MPCore processor and a 4-core SGX543MP4+ graphics processing unit, as well as LiveArea software as its main user interface, which succeeds the XrossMediaBar.

On March 1, 2019, Sony has ended production of the system and physical cartridge games.

PlayStation 4
The PS4 was announced as the successor to the PS3 and was launched in North America on November 15, 2013, in Europe on November 29, 2013 and in Japan on February 23, 2014.

Described by Sony as a "next generation" console, the PS4 included features such as enhanced social capabilities, second-screen options involving devices like the handheld PlayStation Vita, a membership service and compatibility with the Twitch live streaming platform.

Following a January 2014 announcement by the Chinese government that the country's 14-year game console ban would be lifted, the PS4 was scheduled to be the first Sony video game console to be officially and legally released in China since the PlayStation 2—the ban was enacted in 2000 to protect the mental health of young people. Around 70 game developers, including Ubisoft and Koei, will service Chinese PlayStation users.

The Chinese release dates and price details were announced in early December, with January 11, 2015, confirmed by SCEI. The makers announced that both the PS4 and Vita consoles will be released in China, and the former's package will also consist of a 500GB and 1TB hard drive and controller.

The 20th anniversary of the original PS console was celebrated on December 6, 2014, with the release of a limited-edition, anniversary-edition PlayStation 4 with an aesthetic design that recalled the original 1994 PlayStation.

PlayStation 5

The PS5 was announced to succeed the PS4 in 2019, and released in Australia, Japan, New Zealand, North America, and South Korea on November 12, 2020, with a further worldwide release on November 19, 2020.

Software

Development studios

SIE maintains several in-house studios since 2005, with the most recent move to brand these as PlayStation Studios starting in 2020. All of these studios develop PlayStation console-exclusive games for Sony.

In addition to those listed below, Bungie operates as an independent studio and publisher under SIE since July 2022.

Other platforms

SIE began releasing some of its first-party studios' exclusive titles for Windows in 2020, starting with Horizon: Zero Dawn in August 2020, and with Days Gone in May 2021. Layden said in a 2021 interview that he was part of the team that came up with this concept, where they recognized "we need to go out to where these new customers are, where these new fans could be. We need to go to where they are... Because they've decided not to come to my house, so I've got to go their house now. And what's the best way to go to their house? Why not take one of our top-selling games?" Ryan said in an interview that with some of the latter PlayStation 4 titles that "There’s an opportunity to expose those great games to a wider audience" and that Horizon: Zero Dawn release on Windows shows there was a strong interest in further releases. An investor report in 2021 stated that a primary factor in SIE's recent desire to expand into PC gaming under Ryan stems from the motivation to expand the PlayStation brand into China, Russia and India—markets where console-oriented gaming is far less prevalent than in the West and Japan. In June 2021 after acquiring the studio Nixxes which had become their go-to developer for these ports, Sony confirmed that they are dedicated to PC gaming and value PC gamers, although the PlayStation consoles will still be the "first" and "best" places to play their games. Subsequent Windows releases included 2018's God of War in January 2022, Marvel's Spider-Man Remastered in August 2022, the Uncharted: Legacy of Thieves collection and Sackboy: A Big Adventure in October 2022, Marvel's Spider-Man: Miles Morales in November 2022, Returnal  in February 2023, and The Last of Us Part I in March 2023. 

Video Games Chronicle observed that Sony had established a PlayStation PC label around April 2021 to handle the publication of its games on Windows. Because of this, SIE plans to continue to support PC releases of their PlayStation exclusive games and anticipate that by 2025, a third of their games revenue will come from PC sales.

SIE also began seeking the mobile games market, hiring a former content manager for Apple Arcade in 2020, as a means to bring their IPs to this platform. SIE acquired Savage Game Studios as their first dedicated mobile developer within PlayStation Studios in August 2022 for an undisclosed sum. It expects that by 2025, mobile games will make up 20% of their games revenue.

See also
List of Sony Interactive Entertainment video games

References

External links

 
1993 establishments in Japan
American companies established in 2016
American subsidiaries of foreign companies
Companies based in San Mateo, California
Golden Joystick Award winners
Japanese companies established in 1993
Sony subsidiaries
Video game companies established in 1993
Video game companies of Japan
Video game companies of the United States
Video game development companies
Video game publishers